The Jordan national handball team is the national handball team of Jordan and is controlled by Jordan Handball Federation.

Asian Championship record
 1983 – 7th
 1987 – 9th
 2004 – 8th
 2006 – 7th
 2010 – 12th
 2012 – 9th
 2022 – 12th

References

External links
 IHF profile

Men's national handball teams
Handball